National Route 400 is a national highway of Japan connecting Mito, Ibaraki and Nishiaizu, Fukushima, with a total length of 225.7 km (140.24 mi).

References

National highways in Japan
Roads in Fukushima Prefecture
Roads in Ibaraki Prefecture
Roads in Tochigi Prefecture